O Priya Tumi Kothay (Bengali: ও প্রিয়া তুমি কোথায়) is a Bengali song by singer Asif Akbar. The album O Priya Tumi Kothay was released on 2001.The meaning of the song name in English is O Darling where are you? The song gained most popularity with home and also abroad. The song O Priya Tumi Kothay has been listening more than 70 million times on YouTube channel.

References

External links 
 Video link

Bangladeshi film songs
Bengali-language songs
2001 songs
Bengali film songs
Asif Akbar songs